Ángel Adán López Sandoval (born 13 March 1997) is a Mexican footballer who plays as a forward.

References

External links

1997 births
Living people
Mexican footballers
C.F. Monterrey players
C.D. Veracruz footballers
Alebrijes de Oaxaca players
Murciélagos FC footballers
Dorados de Sinaloa footballers
Liga MX players
Ascenso MX players
Association football forwards
People from Guasave
Footballers from Sinaloa